Andrés Gertrúdix (born 1977) is a Spanish actor.

Biography 
Andrés Gertrúdix was born in 1977 in Madrid. He made his feature film debut in Ray Loriga's My Brother's Gun. He is the partner of actress Marian Álvarez, whom with he has featured in Wounded and Dying.

Filmography

Accolades

References 

 
1977 births
Living people
20th-century Spanish male actors
21st-century Spanish male actors
Spanish male film actors
Spanish male television actors
Male actors from Madrid